The 2024 Portland mayoral election will be held on November 5, 2024, to elect the mayor of Portland, Oregon. Incumbent Democratic mayor Ted Wheeler is eligible to run for re-election to a third term in office.

Candidates

Potential
Sam Adams, former mayor (Party affiliation: Democratic)
Ted Wheeler, incumbent mayor (Party affiliation: Democratic)

Declined
Vadim Mozyrsky, administrative law judge and candidate for city commission in 2022

References

Portland
Portland
Mayoral elections in Portland, Oregon